The women's BMX race competition at the 2010 Asian Games in Guangzhou was held on 19 November at the Guangzhou Velodrome.

Schedule
All times are China Standard Time (UTC+08:00)

Results

Qualifying

Final

References

External links 
 
 

BMX Women